William Vaughn, popularly known as Billy Vaughn (born Richard Smith Vaughn, April 12, 1919 – September 26, 1991) was an American musician, singer, multi-instrumentalist, orchestra leader, and A&R man for Dot Records.

Biography
Vaughn was born in Glasgow, Kentucky, United States, where his father, Alvis Radford Vaughn, was a barber who loved music and inspired Vaughn to teach himself to play the mandolin at the age of three, while suffering from measles.  He went on to learn a number of other instruments, including guitar and alto saxophone, his primary instruments.

In 1941, Vaughn joined the United States National Guard for what had been planned as a one-year assignment, but when World War II broke out, he was in for the duration as a valued musician and composer at Camp Shelby, Mississippi. Major General Daniel I. Sultan decided that Vaughn was too valuable to the base's Thirty-Eighth Division big band, and kept him at Camp Shelby for the duration of the war. He decided to make music a career when he was discharged from the army at the end of the war, and on the GI Bill, attended Western Kentucky State College, now known as Western Kentucky University, majoring in music composition.  He had apparently learned to barber from his father, because he did some while studying at Western Kentucky to support himself financially, when he was not able to get jobs playing the piano at local night clubs and lounges.  While he was a student there, three other students, Jimmy Sacca, Donald McGuire, and Seymour Spiegelman, who had formed a vocal trio, the Hilltoppers, recruited Vaughn to play the piano with them.  He soon added his voice to theirs, converting the trio to a quartet. As a member of the group, he also wrote their first hit song, "Trying", which charted in 1952.

In 1954, he left the group to join Dot Records in Gallatin, Tennessee, as music director. He subsequently formed his own orchestra which had a hit single in that same year with "Melody of Love."  It sold over one million copies, and was awarded a gold disc. He went on to have many more hits over the next decade and a half and was the most commercially successful orchestra leader of the rock era.

Vaughn charted a total of 42 singles on the Billboard charts, often based on the sound of two alto saxophones and guitar as his 'trademark'. Vaughn was the bandleader, and he played the lead guitar on most of his songs. He also charted thirty six albums on the Billboard 200, beginning with 1958's Sail Along Silv'ry Moon and ending with 1970's Winter World of Love. He also had nineteen Top 40 hits in (Germany), beginning with the chart-topping "Sail Along, Silv'ry Moon", also a gold record, which was a cover of a 1937 Bing Crosby hit.  He had two more number ones in Germany: "" and "Wheels" (all three were reportedly million sellers). Vaughn's recording of "Wheels" was no. 1 for 14 weeks in Germany (Hit Bilanz) as well as no. 1 in India, New Zealand, and Italy. Vaughn also charted in Australia, Latin America, and Japan.  "Pearly Shells" was a major success in Japan.  Vaughn's tours of that country began about the time "Pearly Shells" was a hit in 1965.  Many songs which were not US hits or even singles releases there were major hits in other countries.  These included "Lili Marlene", "Zwei Gitarren am Meer", "Blueberry Hill" (Germany), and "Greenfields". Also successful were "Song of Peace", "It's a Lonesome Old Town" (Japan), "Michelle" (no 1 in Argentina and Malaysia), "Mexico" (no. 1 in the Philippines), and "Bonanza" (a major success in Brazil and Italy) plus "Theme from the Dark at the Top of the Stairs" (various Latin American countries). The album La Paloma was a success throughout Latin America. He also had a number one album in Germany in the early 1980s with Moonlight Melodies, which consisted of 20 of Billy's biggest hits (original Dot recordings, original LP notes and credits).

The Billy Vaughn Orchestra began touring in 1965 with numerous sell-out tours throughout Japan, Brazil, and South Korea.

In the late 1960s and early 1970s, Vaughn lived in Palm Springs, California. He died of peritoneal mesothelioma at Palomar Hospital in Escondido, California, on September 26, 1991, aged 72. He and his wife Marion are buried at the Oak Hill Memorial Park in Escondido.

The Billy Vaughn Orchestra, co-owned and managed by his son, Richard Smith Vaughn Jr., is still a touring big band. Produced by the Tate Corporation, Japan, it toured Japan in 2013, 2014, and again in 2018 to sell-out audiences.

Discography

Albums

Singles

References

External links
 Billy Vaughn page at the Space Age Pop Page
 The Billy Vaughn fan page
 Western Kentucky University page on Billy Vaughn and the Hilltoppers
 

1919 births
1991 deaths
20th-century American guitarists
20th-century American pianists
20th-century American saxophonists
Easy listening musicians
Orchestra leaders
People from Glasgow, Kentucky
People from Escondido, California
Musicians from Palm Springs, California
Traditional pop music singers
Western Kentucky University alumni
Dot Records artists
Deaths from cancer in California
Deaths from peritoneal cancer
20th-century American singers
Singers from Kentucky
20th-century American male singers